Rowing at the 1928 Summer Olympics featured seven events, for men only. The competitions were held from 2 to 10 August.

Medal summary

Participating nations
A total of 244 rowers from 19 nations competed at the Amsterdam Games:

 
 
 
 
 
 
 
 
 
 
 
 
 
 
 
 
 
 
 

Only one rower (Joseph Wright Jr.) and one coxswain (Georges Anthony) competed in more than one event.

Medal table

See also
Rowing at the Summer Olympics

References

External links
 International Olympic Committee medal database

 
1928 Summer Olympics events
1928